Mehmet Uslu (born 25 February 1988) is a Turkish footballer who plays as a left back for Sapanca Gençlikspor.

Honours 
Konyaspor
Turkish Cup: 2016–17

References

External links
 
 
 

1988 births
Living people
Turkish footballers
Sakaryaspor footballers
Konyaspor footballers
Kartalspor footballers
Hacettepe S.K. footballers
Çaykur Rizespor footballers
Adana Demirspor footballers
İstanbulspor footballers
Eyüpspor footballers
Süper Lig players
TFF First League players
TFF Third League players
Turkey youth international footballers
Association football midfielders